The 2018–19 UCF Knights men's basketball team represented the University of Central Florida during the 2018–19 NCAA Division I men's basketball season. The Knights were members of the American Athletic Conference. The Knights, in the program's 50th season of basketball, were led by third-year head coach Johnny Dawkins and played their home games at the CFE Arena on the university's main campus in Orlando, Florida. They finished the season 24–9, 13–5 in AAC play to finish in a tie for third place. They lost in the quarterfinals of the AAC tournament to Memphis. They received an at-large bid to the NCAA tournament where they defeated VCU in the first round before losing in the second round to Duke.

Previous season
The Knights finished the 2017–18 season 19–13 overall and 9–9 in AAC play to finish in sixth place. In the AAC tournament, they defeated East Carolina in the first round before losing to Houston in the quarterfinals. Despite having 19 wins, they did not participate in a postseason tournament.

Offseason

Departures

Incoming transfers

2018 recruiting class

Roster

Schedule and results
On March 2, UCF defeated (#8 AP Poll/#6 Coaches Poll) Houston at Fertitta Center stopping the nation's longest home winning streak at 33. With the win UCF entered the AP Poll for the first time since the 2010–11 UCF Knights spent four weeks in the poll peaking at 19.

|-
!colspan=9 style=| Exhibition

|-
!colspan=9 style=| Non-conference regular season

|-
!colspan=6 style= |AAC regular season

|-
!colspan=9 style=| American Athletic Conference tournament

|-
!colspan=9 style=| NCAA tournament

Rankings

*AP does not release post-NCAA Tournament rankings^Coaches did not release a Week 2 poll.

References

UCF Knights men's basketball seasons
UCF
UCF Knights men's basketball
UCF Knights men's basketball
UCF